The  is an award presented annually in Japan since 1961 by the Japan Railfan Club. It is awarded for railway vehicles that entered service in the previous year and voted by the selection committee as having the most outstanding functional and design features.

Award winners

The list of award winners since 1961 is as follows.

See also

 List of motor vehicle awards
 Blue Ribbon Award (railway)

References

External links

  
 The Blue Ribbon & Laurel Prize: Japan's Best New Trains, Japan Railway Journal on NHK World-Japan

Awards established in 1961
Railway culture in Japan
Commercial vehicle awards
Japanese awards
Rail transport industry awards